Floritettix is a genus of spur-throated grasshoppers in the family Acrididae. There are about 13 described species in Floritettix, found in North America.

Species
These 13 species belong to the genus Floritettix:

 Floritettix aptera (Scudder, 1878) (wingless Florida grasshopper)
 Floritettix borealis (Hebard, 1936)
 Floritettix calusa Otte, 2014
 Floritettix coquinae (Hebard, 1936)
 Floritettix floridana Otte, 2014
 Floritettix hadjoi Otte, 2014
 Floritettix holatamico Otte, 2014
 Floritettix hubbelli (Hebard, 1936)
 Floritettix nigropicta (Hebard, 1936)
 Floritettix ocilla Otte, 2014
 Floritettix osceola Otte, 2014
 Floritettix saturiba (Hebard, 1936)
 Floritettix simplex (Hebard, 1936)

References

External links

 

Acrididae